Dorough is a surname. Notable people with this surname include:

Bo Dorough, American lawyer and politician
Bob Dorough, American bebop and cool jazz vocalist
Dalee Sambo Dorough, Inuit expert in international human rights law, international relations, and Alaska Native rights
Howie Dorough, American singer, songwriter, and actor

See also
Dorough Round Barn and Farm, a farm in the U.S. state of Georgia
Dorrough, American rapper
Michael L. Dorrough, American inventor and audio engineer